Diastatidae are a family of flies in the order Diptera. They are encountered primarily in the Holarctic Region, but several species are found in the Oriental, Neotropical and Australasian regions. Members of the family number over 20 described species in three genera. There is an additional fossil genus.

Description
For terms see Morphology of Diptera

Minute flies with grey or brown-grey body and, usually, maculate wings. The postvertical bristles on head are cruciate and vibrissae are present on the head are present. The front orbital bristles are inset and upswept. The costa is interrupted near the end of Radial vein 1 and sometimes also near the humeral crossvein. The subcosta is incomplete fusing with Radial vein 1 before the apex. The posterior basal wing cell and discoidal wing cell are separate. The anal cell of wing and the anal vein of wing are both present.

Biology
Adults of living forms have been found along margins of bogs, marshes, and the edges of moist woodlands. Immature biologies are largely unknown. Hennig wrote about it thought to be Campichoeta punctum.

Genera
 Diastatinae
Diastata Meigen, 1830
 Campichoetinae
Campichoeta Macquart, 1835 (sometimes treated as a separate family Campichoetidae)
Euthychaeta Loew, 1864
†Pareuthychaeta Hennig 1965

Identification
Duda, O. (1934), Ephydridae. 6, 1, 58e, 1-18.In: Lindner, E. (Ed.). Die Fliegen der Paläarktischen Region 6: 1–115. Keys to Palaearctic species but now needs revision (in German).
A.A. Shtakel 'berg Family Diastatidae in Bei-Bienko, G. Ya, 1988 Keys to the insects of the European Part of the USSR Volume 5 (Diptera) Part 2 English edition. Keys to Palaearctic species but now needs revision .

Phylogeny

Other
Diastatidae were once considered by some to be Ephydridae.

References

Wayne N. Mathis & David A. Barraclough  Contributions to a Manual of Palaearctic Diptera. 3: 523-530. Science Herald, Budapest World Catalog and Conspectus on the Family Diastatidae (Diptera: Schizophora) Myia, 12:235–266 online here

External links

Diastatidae in Italian.
Diptera.info Images

 
Brachycera families
Articles containing video clips